The Hunted is a 2015 American film based on the action comedy web series The Hunted (2001) created and directed by Robert Chapin. Starring Chapin and Monique Ganderton in lead roles.it tells the story of a struggling actor who leads a group of misfit slayers against an army of vampires. The film is one of the first to be produced under SAG’s New Media contract and was distributed online through Vimeo VOD.

Plot 
Coming to terms with his unsuccessful attempts at becoming an actor, Bob (Chapin) is bitten by a vampire named Susan, (Ganderton) who is the daughter of a crazed vigilante slayer. Consequently, Bob becomes one of the Hunted, a small group of humans, bitten but not turned, who use cold steel and fighting technique to fend off vampires. The vampires, however, have developed an immunity to everything over the years, and the only way they can be killed is with a sword. Luckily, Bob knows how to wield a sword, mostly due to his starring role in a cheesy 80’s action flick called, “Vampslayer”. Find How Bob helps Susan and the Hunted defend the vampires forms the rest of the story.

Cast 
 Robert Chapin as Bob
 Monique Ganderton as Susan
 David Lain Baker as Harry
 Gary Kasper as Dragos
 Tex Wall as Lore Master
 Andrew Helm as Kevin
 Anthony De Longis as Vincent

Production

Conception and writing 
The Hunted began in 2001 as a long-standing Internet series, created by Chapin in an effort to train his credentials as a stuntman and VFX-artist. Embracing his skills with a sword and his technical abilities behind the camera, he collaborated with his friends and colleagues in order to combine their talents and undertake an underdog story of LA-based vampire hunters. The fact that user-generated content created by fans became the main content source for the online series is reflected in the theme of the film, where soccer moms learn to become vampire slayers, just like fans learning to become filmmakers, thus providing everyone a chance to discover their true potential. The dialogues in the film make use of copious lines from well-known films and poems, ranging from Scarface (1983) and Independence Day (1996) to Shakespeare.

Filming 
The film received financial support in June 2011 via a Kickstarter campaign. The film was shot in Hollywood, California in 2012 and is co-produced by New Deal Studios, the Academy Award-winning effects studio behind numerous blockbuster films, including Inception (2010) and Interstellar (2014). Post-production was completed in March 2015. The majority of the film's cast consisted of stunt people.

References

External links 
 Official website
 

American action comedy films
American vampire films
Films set in Los Angeles
2015 action comedy films
Films shot in Los Angeles
2010s English-language films
2010s American films